This is an incomplete list of festivals in Japan.

Traditional festivals

Film festivals

Music festivals

See also
 Japanese festivals
 Abare Festival
 Matsuri float

References

 
 
 Japan
 Japan